Nyhavn 12 is a listed property overlooking the Nyhavn canal in central Copenhagen, Denmark.

History
Nyhavn 12 was built circa 1770 for merchant and shipowner Andreas Bodenhoff.

The economist Oluf Christian Olufsen (1764–1827) was a resident in the building in 1809–1810. He worked for Det Classenske Fideicommis and became a professor at the University of Copenhagen in 1815. The deaf-mute painter  lived in the building from 1857 to 1863. The building was listed by the Danish Heritage Agency in the Danish national registry of protected buildings in 1817. The registration was expanded in 2000.

Holmegaard Glass Factory operated a glass shop in the ground floor from 1918 to 1973.

Architecture
The building is six bays wide and has a mansard roof with a large wall dormer. A 13-bay side wing extends from the rear side of the building.

Today
The florist Port Nouveau – Erik Buch is located on the ground floor. A number of small law firms, including Mikael Skjødt Advokater and Kåre Pihlmann, are also based in the building.

References

External links

 Nyhavn at indenforvoldene.dk

Houses in Copenhagen
Listed residential buildings in Copenhagen
Houses completed in 1770